A total lunar eclipse took place on Monday, December 30, 1963. The Moon was plunged into darkness for 1 hour and 18 minutes, in a deep total eclipse which saw the Moon 33.5% of its diameter inside the Earth's umbral shadow. The visual effect of this depends on the state of the Earth's atmosphere, but the Moon may have been stained a deep red colour. The partial eclipse lasted for 3 hours and 24 minutes in total.

Visibility

Related lunar eclipses

Lunar year series

Saros series
It was part of Saros series 124.

Tritos 
 Preceded: Lunar eclipse of January 29, 1953
 Followed: Lunar eclipse of November 29, 1974

Tzolkinex 
 Preceded: Lunar eclipse of November 18, 1956
 Followed: Lunar eclipse of February 10, 1970

See also
List of lunar eclipses
List of 20th-century lunar eclipses

Notes

External links

1963-12
1963 in science
December 1963 events